Cameron "Cam" Bolton (born 21 November 1990) is an Australian snowboarder. He competed at the 2014 Winter Olympics in Sochi, Russia, and the 2018 Winter Olympics in Pyeongchang, South Korea.

References

External links
 

1990 births
Living people
Australian male snowboarders
Olympic snowboarders of Australia
Snowboarders at the 2014 Winter Olympics
Snowboarders at the 2018 Winter Olympics
Snowboarders at the 2022 Winter Olympics